Hugues Merle (1822–1881) was a French painter who mostly depicted sentimental or moral subjects. He has often been compared with William-Adolphe Bouguereau.

Biography
Hugues Merle was born in 1822 in La Sône. He studied painting with Léon Cogniet. Merle started exhibiting at the Salon (Paris) in 1847. He received second class prizes in 1861 and 1863. In 1866 he was made Chevalier of the Legion of Honor.

Hugues Merle became a friend of Paul Durand-Ruel in the early 1860s. Durand-Ruel had started buying paintings by Merle in 1862 and introduced the artist to painter William-Adolphe Bouguereau. Merle was later often compared to Bouguereau and “became a considerable rival of Bouguereau in subject and treatment”. In the mid-1860s, Merle painted several portraits of Paul Durand-Ruel, his wife, and their son, John.

Hugues Merle died in 1881 in Paris.  His son Georges Merle also became a painter.

Gallery

References

Bibliography
European Art in the High Museum, by Eric M. Zafran, Atlanta, 1984
"Accounting for Tastes", by Linda Whiteley, Oxford Art Journal, Vol. 2, Art and Society (Apr., 1979), pp. 25–28

19th-century French painters
French male painters
French Roman Catholics
1823 births
1881 deaths
Burials at Père Lachaise Cemetery
19th-century French male artists